Events in the year 1982 in Greece.

Incumbents
President – Konstantinos Karamanlis
Prime Minister of Greece – Andreas Papandreou

Births

 27 January – Eva Asderaki, tennis umpire

References

 
Years of the 20th century in Greece
Greece
1980s in Greece
Greece